Race for the Galaxy (abbreviated "RftG" or simply "Race") is a card game designed by Thomas Lehmann. It was released in 2007 by Rio Grande Games. Its theme is to build galactic civilizations via game cards that represent worlds or technical and social developments.  It accommodates two to four players by default although expansions allow for up to six players, as well as solo play. The game uses iconography in place of language in some places, with complex powers also having a text description. While appreciated by experienced players for being concise, some new players find the icons difficult to learn and to decipher.

The game won Boardgamegeek's Golden Geek Award for best card game, Fairplay Magazine's À la carte award for best card game of 2008, and was described by the magazine Tric Trac as "LE jeu de cartes de cette année 2008" (THE card game of the year 2008).

Gameplay
Like many other Euro-style games, players win Race by having the most victory points at game end. VPs come from three sources: worlds and developments placed on a player's tableau, and VP chips earned by consuming goods from worlds. To place a world or development, players pay a cost in cards from their hand. Keeping a steady income of new cards throughout the game is important to victory.

Phase selection 
At the start of each round, all players simultaneously and secretly choose one of five phases: Explore, Develop, Settle, Consume, or Produce. Selections are revealed simultaneously. The only phases which actually occur in a round are those selected by players. Additionally, the players who picked a certain phase get a special bonus during that phase, such as the ability to look at more cards during the Explore phase.

Every card in play has powers which are active during various phases. For instance, the development  "Investment Credits" has a Develop power which makes placing developments one card cheaper.

Round play 
Within a round, phases (those selected by players) happen in the following order:
 Explore – Draw two cards and keep one.
 Develop – Play a development.
 Settle – Play a world, either by paying to take it peacefully or by military conquest.
 Consume – "Ship" resources for cards and VPs. As a bonus activity, players can Trade a resource to earn many cards, but no VPs.
 Produce – Put a good (a face-down card from the deck) on all production worlds that do not have one.
After all phases are complete, players discard down to a hand limit of 10 cards.  Unusually among card games, cards discarded due to the hand limit or when paying a cost are placed face-down (in a "messy" pile to distinguish them from the draw deck), concealing information that could be used to deduce upcoming draws.

Play continues until, at the end of a round, either at least one player has 12 or more cards in their tableau, or the entire starting pool of victory point tokens has been claimed by the players. At that point, the player with the highest total of victory points from tokens and from cards in their tableau is the winner.

Race vs. other titles
The play style of the game is similar to that of another Rio Grande game, San Juan, which is the card game version of the board game Puerto Rico. Lehmann, Race'''s designer, developed his own card game version of Puerto Rico at the request of the publisher. Some of its ideas were incorporated in San Juan. Later, Lehmann used those ideas to create a different game, one of space exploration, settlement, and conquest rather than development in the colonial Caribbean.

The principal difference in the playing sequence between Race and Puerto Rico/San Juan is that in the latter games, a given phase can only be chosen by one player each round, and the order of activities is based on player order and the phases each player picks in succession; in Race, multiple players may choose the same phase, and the order of activity execution is fixed.

Wei-Hwa Huang, who is credited as a development assistant for Race, went on to become the primary designer of Roll for the Galaxy (assisted by Tom Lehmann). In this adaptation six-sided dice represent a player's workers, with rolls determining what phases workers are placed in.

Expansions

During playtesting, plans were made for two expansionsRace for the Galaxy Designer Preview #3:  to add more variety to gameplay, shore up certain strategies, and to accommodate more players. The game's success prompted the publisher to request a third expansion, as well as new expansions not requiring the original trio.

Currently there are five expansions for Race. The first three expansions, Gathering Storm, Rebel vs Imperium, and The Brink of War, comprise the first expansion arc. These expansions thematically focus on a struggle for galactic control between the militarily powerful Imperium and a Rebel uprising. The second arc, which is designed to be played separately from the first, includes only the expansion Alien Artifacts, about the revival of long-dead Alien overseer technology. In the third arc the Xeno Invasion set chronicles a catastrophic invasion by monstrous "Xenos" from a distant world.

All the expansions provide new game cards, starting worlds, and support for at least five players. Many new mechanics also interact with base set keywords, such as "Rebel" or "Uplift".

The Gathering Storm
The first expansion adds components for a fifth player, additional cards, goals (opportunities to gain extra victory points chosen at random at game start), and rules and components for solo play (against a "robot" player)."Game Preview: Race for the Galaxy: The Gathering Storm" , By Tom Lehmann, September 26, 2008, Boardgame News.

Rebel vs Imperium
The second expansion is intended for use with the first expansion. It adds components for a sixth player, more cards and goals, and direct player interaction in takeovers of other players' military worlds; players who refrain from playing certain cards are immune to conquest. Takeovers are optional and the rules for this expansion encourage trying the game both with and without them. This set also introduces many new Rebel and Imperium Cards and introduces a special two-player scenario where one player takes the role of The Imperium while the other starts with a Rebel homeworld. In this variant the starting hands consist partly of Imperium/Rebel cards and takeovers are allowed.

The Brink of War
The third expansion adds still more cards, and goals, as well as a new mechanic called galactic prestige. Each round the player(s) with the most prestige earn an additional victory point and possibly a card. Each prestige is worth one victory point at the end of the game, and many of the new cards allow prestige to be spent (for victory points, cards, or other effects). Additionally, a new "once-per-game" action is introduced that allows the user to search the deck for a card meeting a specific stated requirement, or to enhance the bonus the user earns in a round (at the cost of one prestige). The set further extends takeover options: the Interstellar Casus Belli development can allow attacks against anyone, and the Imperium Planet Buster can destroy enemy worlds outright.

Alien Artifacts
The fourth expansion is used with only the base game and was released during 2013. It includes new explore powers and an optional "orb game" in which players explore for victory points and new powers. Some players have criticized the gameplay of the orb game while praising the game cards in the set, saying that the orb makes the overall game play non-simultaneously and last too long.

Xeno Invasion
The fifth expansion, published 2015, is for use with the base game only. According to Lehmann, "XI'' is aimed at intermediate players" and has the most new base cards of any expansion so far. It allows for up to 5 players, and in addition to new world and development cards it includes an optional "Invasion Game", in which players must defeat three waves of Xeno alien invaders. Players can earn bonuses by contributing to the war effort, but the game can also end in two new ways: repulsing the Xeno threat or losing to the invaders.

References

External links
 Rio Grande Games: Race for the Galaxy
 
 Keldon's AI began an open source program for Windows, Macintosh, and Linux, implementing Race for the Galaxy against human and AI opponents. While unofficial, the project has been specifically allowed by Lehmann and Rio Grande.  The most recent version can be found at github.
 A Race for the Galaxy app was released in 2017, on Steam/iOS/Android, for PC/mobile/tablets. As of early 2018 the first arc of expansions are available as in-app purchases.

Dedicated deck card games
Fiction set around Epsilon Eridani
Rio Grande Games games
Space opera games
Card games introduced in 2007